Jung Mi-Kyung (4 February 1960 – 18 January 2017) was a modern South Korean novelist.

Life
Jung Mi-Kyung was born on February 4, 1960, in Masan, South Gyeongsang Province, South Korea. Jung graduated from Ewha Womans University with a degree in English literature and in 1987 made her literary debut by winning the drama category of the JoongAng Literary Award. After this, however, she withdrew from literary work for over a decade, re-entering the scene as a novelist, debuting with the short story "The Woman With Arsenic" in the Fall volume of World Literature. Thereafter, she has concentrated on her literary career with great success.

Work
Korean critic Kim Kyung-Yeon has referred to Jung's work as, "(portraying) a deceptive society full of absurd spectacles, where truth and falseness are intertwined, appearances define nature, and values are destroyed. She shows us the dark side of post-capitalist society through those who struggle to live amidst these absurd spectacles.

Selected works

Works in translation
 He Gave Me Roses of the Balkans (translated by Stella Kim)
 My Son's Girlfriend (translated by Yu Young-nan)

Works in Korean

Short stories
 "Heavy Snow"
 "The Woman with Arsenic" (2001)
 "Divide, the Night" (2006)

Novels
 La Vie en Rose (2002)
 The Strange Sorrow of Wonderland (2005)
 Stars of Africa (2010)

Short story collections
 Bloodstained Lover (2004)
 They Gave Me Balkan Roses (2006)
 My Son's Girlfriend (2008)
 French Laundry (2013)

Awards
 Yi Sang Literature Award (2006) - for "Divide, the Night"
 Today's Artist Award (2002)

References 

1960 births
2017 deaths
South Korean women novelists
South Korean novelists
Ewha Womans University alumni
People from Changwon
21st-century novelists
21st-century South Korean women writers